The Trask River is in northwestern Oregon in the United States. It drains a mountainous timber-producing area of the Northern Oregon Coast Range west of Portland into Tillamook Bay and the Pacific Ocean.  It is one of five rivers—the Tillamook, the Trask, the Wilson, the Kilchis, and the Miami—that flow into the bay.

It flows generally west into eastern Tillamook County.

The river is known for its runs of Steelhead and Chinook salmon.

The river is named for Elbridge Trask who settled on the shores of Tillamook Bay in 1848. Trask's overland journey was described in the 1960 historical novel Trask by Don Berry, as well as two sequels. The novels are collectively known as the "Trask novels."

Course

The Trask River is formed by the confluence of North Fork Trask River and South Fork Trask River near Trask County Park in the Tillamook State Forest. It is paralleled for much of its length by Trask River Road. Over the next  Burton, Blue Ridge, Hatchery, Trowbridge, Little Rock,  and Panther creeks all enter from the right. The river passes a United States Geological Survey stream gauge at river mile (RM) 10.95 or river kilometer (RK) 17.62, just before receiving Cedar Creek from the right.

Thereafter, Gold and Hanenkrat creeks enter from the left and Green Creek from the right. About  later, the stream passes under U.S. Route 101 and flows around the southwestern edge of Tillamook. Receiving Hoquarten and Nolan sloughs from the right, it merges with the Tillamook River and flows into Tillamook Bay near Memaloose Point.

Discharge

See also 
 List of rivers of Oregon

References

External links

Trask River Steelhead circa 1936

Rivers of Oregon
Rivers of Tillamook County, Oregon
Rivers of Washington County, Oregon